RHFS may refer to:

Régiment d'hélicoptères des forces spéciales
Rich Hall's Fishing Show

See also

 
 
 RHF (disambiguation)